George Knight (28 March 1835 – 8 January 1901) was an English cricketer.  Knight was a right-handed batsman who fielded as a wicket-keeper.  He occasionally bowled underarm slow.  He was born at Petworth, Sussex.

Knight made his first-class debut for Sussex against Kent in 1860.  He played infrequently for Sussex over the next fourteen years, making twelve further first-class appearances, the last of which came against Gloucestershire in 1874.  In his thirteen first-class appearances, he scored a total of 125 runs at an average of 6.25, with a high score of 21.  In the field he took 8 catches and made 11 stumpings.  With his occasionally underarm bowling, he took just a single wicket.

He died at the town of his birth on 8 January 1901.

References

External links
George Knight at ESPNcricinfo
George Knight at CricketArchive

1835 births
1901 deaths
People from Petworth
English cricketers
Sussex cricketers
Wicket-keepers